The Fundamental Law of Vatican City State, promulgated by Pope John Paul II on 26 November 2000, is the main governing document of the Vatican's civil entities. It obtained the force of law of 22 February 2001, Feast of the Chair of St. Peter, Apostle, and replaced in its entirety law N. I (the Fundamental Law of Vatican City of 7 June 1929). All the norms in force in Vatican City State which were not in agreement with the new Law were abrogated and the original of the Fundamental Law, bearing the Seal of Vatican City State, was deposited in the Archive of the Laws of Vatican City State and the corresponding text was published in the Supplement to the Acta Apostolicae Sedis. The law consists of 20 Articles.

Introductory paragraph

Article One (powers)

Section One (absolute monarch)
Art. 1 §1 declares that “The Supreme Pontiff, Sovereign of Vatican City State, has the fullness of legislative, executive and judicial powers.”

Section Two (Interregnum)
Art. 1 §2 says that during an Interregnum, the same Powers stated in §1 belong to the College of Cardinals but that this College can only issue legislative dispositions in cases of urgency and with efficacy limited to the time of interregnum, unless confirmed by the Pope elected according to the norm of Canon Law (the Ap. Const. Universi Dominici Gregis governs papal elections and is thus implied by this wording).

Article Two (Secretariat of State)
Art. 2 states that the representation of Vatican City State in relations with foreign nations and other subjects of international law, for the purpose of diplomatic relations and the conclusion of treaties, is reserved to the Supreme Pontiff himself, who exercises this right by means of the Secretariat of State.

Article Three (legislature)

Section One (Pontifical Commission for Vatican City State)
Art. 3 §1 decrees that “legislative power, except for those cases which the Supreme Pontiff intends to reserve to himself or to other subjects, is exercised by a Commission” (or the Pontifical Commission for Vatican City State) which is composed of a Cardinal President and other Cardinals, all of which are named by the Supreme Pontiff for a term of five years.

Section Two (absence or impedance of the President)
Art. 3 §2 provides for the case of absence or impedance of the President, and decrees that the Commission would be presided over by the first of the Cardinal Members.

Section Three (meetings)
Art. 3 §3 describes who convokes and presides over the meetings of the Commission (the President) and says that “the Secretary General and the Vice Secretary General participate in them with a consultative vote.”

Article Four (drafting laws)

Section One
Art. 4 §1 demands that the Commission exercise its power within the limits of the law concerning the sources of law, according to the indications to be given in future Articles and its proper Regulations.

Section Two
§2 prescribes that the Commission, in the drawing up of draft laws, makes use of the collaboration of the Councillors of Vatican City State, of other experts and of the Organizations of the Holy See and of the State which could be affected by them.

Section Three
§3 says “The draft laws are submitted in advance, through the Secretariat of State, for the consideration of the Supreme Pontiff.”

Article Five (executive power)
Art. 5 §1 gives executive power to the President of the Commission, in conformity with the Fundamental Law and with the other normative dispositions in force at Vatican City State.
§2 gives the President the assistance of the Secretary General and the Vice Secretary General in the exercise of Executive power.
§3 says that “Questions of greater importance are submitted by the President to the Commission for its study.”

Article Six (important matters)
Art. 6 declares that “Matters of greater importance are dealt with together with the Secretariat of State.”

Article Seven (emergency legislative powers)
Art. 7 §1 gives the President of the Commission the power to issue Ordinances, putting into effect legislative and regulatory norms.

§2 gives the power to the President to issue in cases of urgent necessity, dispositions having the force of law, which however lose their force if they are not confirmed by the Commission within ninety days.

§3 reserves the power to issue general Regulations to the Commission.

Article Eight
Art. 8 §1 declares that, without prejudice to the primacy of the Supreme Pontiff, and what is established in Art. 2 regarding the Secretariat of State, the President of the Commission represents the State.

§2 provides for the President to delegate legal representation to the General Secretary for ordinary administrative activity.

Article Nine
Art. 9 §1 states the responsibilities of  the Secretary General:

1. He assists the President of the Commission in his functions.

2. According to the modalities indicated in the Laws of Vatican City State and under the directives of the President of the Commission, he:

a) oversees the application of the Laws and of the other normative dispositions and the
putting into effect of the decisions and directives of the President of the Commission;

b) oversees the administrative activity of the Governorate and coordinates the functions of the various Directorates.

§2 gives the Secretary General the right to take the place of the President of the Commission when the President is absent or impeded, except for what is determined in Art. 7, §2.

Article Ten
Art. 10 §1 outlines the powers to the Vice Secretary General: In accord with the Secretary General, he oversees the preparation and drafting of the various proceedings and of the correspondence and carries out the other activities attributed to him.

§2 gives the Vice Secretary General the right to take the place of the Secretary General when the Secretary General is absent or impeded.

Article Eleven
Art. 11 §1 explains that in the preparation and the study of accounts and for other affairs of a general order concerning the personnel and activity of the Vatican, the President of the Commission is assisted by the Council of Directors, which he periodically convenes and leads.

§2 grants the Secretary General and the Vice Secretary General the right to take part in the Council.

Article Twelve
Art. 12 prescribes that the financial budgets and reports of the Vatican, after their approval by the Commission, are submitted to the Pope through the Secretariat of State.

Article Thirteen
Art. 13 §1 gives The Councillor General and the Councillors of the State, named by the Supreme Pontiff for a five-year term, the responsibility to offer their assistance in the drafting of Laws and in other matters of particular importance.

§2 provides for the consultation of the Councillors both individually and collegially.

§3 decrees that the Councillor General presides over the meetings of the Councillors and that he also exercises functions of coordination and representation of the State, according to the indications of the President of the Commission.

Article Fourteen
Art. 14 gives the President of the Commission the right, in addition to using the Corps of Vigilance, to request the assistance of the Pontifical Swiss Guard for the purpose of security and policing.

Article Fifteen
Art. 15 §1 asserts that, in the name of the Pope, Judicial power is exercised by the organs
constituted according to the judicial structure of Vatican City State.

§2 gives the power of regulation of the competence of the individual organs to the Civil Laws of Vatican City State.

§3 demands that acts of jurisdiction must be carried out within the territory of the Vatican.

Article Sixteen
Art. 16 gives the Pope the power to defer the instruction and the decision in any civil or penal case and in any stage of the same to a particular subject, even with the faculty of pronouncing a decision according to equity and with the exclusion of any further recourse.

Article Seventeen
Art. 17 §1 gives whoever claims that a proper right or legitimate interest has been damaged by an administrative act the right to propose hierarchical recourse or approach the competent judicial authority.

§2 states that “Hierarchical recourse precludes a judicial action in the same matter, unless the Supreme Pontiff authorizes it in the individual case.”

Article Eighteen
Art. 18 §1 gives the Labour Office of the Apostolic See the faculty to hear controversies concerning labour relations between the employees of the State and the Administration, according to its own Statute.

§2 gives the Court of Appeal the faculty to hear cases of recourse against disciplinary provisions taken in regard to the employees of the State, according to its own norms.

Article Nineteen
Art. 19 reserves the faculty to grant amnesties, indults, remissions and favours to the Supreme Pontiff.

Article Twenty (flag, coat of arms and seal)

Art. 20 §1 enumerates the design of the flag of Vatican City State (see Flag of Vatican City).

§2 describes that the coat of arms is constituted by the tiara and keys (see Coat of arms of the State of Vatican City).

§3 asserts that “the seal of the State bears in the centre the tiara with the keys and around it the words ‘Stato della Città del Vaticano,’ according to the model which forms attachment C to the present Law.”

"Given" clause

See also
Index of Vatican City-related articles

References

2000 in law
Government of Vatican City
Law of Vatican City
V